Tokar may refer to:

People
 Eliot Tokar, American practitioner of Tibetan medicine, author, and lecturer
 František Tokár (1925–1993), Czechoslovakian table tennis player
 Moishe Tokar (fl. 1905–1910), Jewish anarchist
 Norman Tokar (1919–1979), American director
 Olena Tokar (born 1987), Ukrainian operatic lyric soprano

Places
 Tokar, Besni, a village in the district of Besni, Adıyaman Province, Turkey
 Tokar, Sudan

See also